Hanušovice is a town in Šumperk District in the Olomouc Region of the Czech Republic. It has about 3,000 inhabitants. The Holba brewery is located in the town.

Administrative parts
Villages of Hynčice nad Moravou, Potůčník, Vysoké Žibřidovice and Žleb are administrative parts of Hanušovice.

Etymology
The name of Hanušovice is derived from its original name Hanns Dorf / Hanušova ves, which is equivalent to "John's village".

Geography
It lies in the Hanušovice Highlands. The town is situated in a narrow valley at a confluence of the rivers Morava and Branná.

History
The first written mention of Hanušovice is from 1325. The village was burned down during the Bohemian–Hungarian War (1468–1478) and renewed a hundred years later. In the 16th century, the hamlet of Holba was founded. Hanušovice was originally an agricultural village, but became industrialised in 1852 after the cotton mill was established. In 1923, Hanušovice and Holba were merged. The municipality became a town in 1975.

Hanušovice was originally ethnically a German village. During the World War II, the Gross Rosen concentration camp was located nearby, and Polish Jewish women had to work in factories. The English prisoners of war also worked there. After the war, the whole German population was expelled and Hanušovice was resettled by Czechs.

Demographics

Economy

Hanušovice is known for the Holba brewery, founded in 1874.

Transport
Hanušovice is a railway junction. It lies on two railway lines: Šumperk–Hanušovice–Jeseník and Zábřeh–Hanušovice–Jeseník. The mountain section from Hanušovice to Jeseník was reconstructed and modernized in 2015–2017, and the railway station in Hanušovice in 2021.

Culture
The town hosts a beer festival every year, known as Pivovarské slavnosti ("Brewery festivities"). It is organized by the Holba Brewery and is situated in the brewery's areal. Two stages are presented with music performances are presented. Special kinds of beers are prepared.

Sights
The landmark is the Church of Saint Nicholas with a Renaissance core from 1656. It was baroque reconstructed in 1783. The church complex includes a Baroque statue of Saint John of Nepomuk from 1748 and a Marian column from 1825 in the Empire style.

The Empire style building of the rectory is from the 1830s.

There is a small museum in the brewery.

Notable people
Arnold Walter (1902–1973), Canadian musicologist and composer

Twin towns – sister cities

Hanušovice is twinned with:
 Nitrianske Pravno, Slovakia

References

External links

Cities and towns in the Czech Republic
Populated places in Šumperk District
Holocaust locations in Czechoslovakia